Aiaktalik Island is an island located in the Gulf of Alaska approximately  south of Kodiak Island. The island is 20 km2 and uninhabited.

References

Islands of the Kodiak Archipelago
Islands of Alaska